The 2003–04 season saw Barnsley compete in the Football League Second Division where they finished in 12th position with 62 points.

Final league table

Results
Barnsley's score comes first

Legend

Football League Second Division

FA Cup

Football League Cup

Football League Trophy

Squad statistics

References

External links
 Barnsley 2003–04 at Soccerbase.com (select relevant season from dropdown list)

Barnsley F.C. seasons
Barnsley